Fernando de Aragón y Guardato, 1st Duke of Montalto (before 1494–1542) was the eldest bastard son of king Ferdinand I of Naples and Diana Guardato, one of his mistresses.

The addition "Montalto de Aragón" is in remembrance of his grandfather, Alfonso V of Aragon.

Marriages and issue

Fernando was the ninth child of Ferdinand I of Naples. He first married Anna Sanseverino. The marriage was without issue.

He then married, Castellana de Cardona, and had the following:

 Antonio d'Aragona y Cardona?, 2nd Duke of Montalto, (*Naples, Italy,  1499/1506 - +Naples, Italy, 1543); 1st marriage: 1541, Ippolita della Rovere (1525–1561). 2nd marriage: Giulia Antonia de Cardona, Countess di Collisano
 Pietro d'Aragona y de Cardona, 3rd Duke of Montalto, +after 1543
 Antonio d'Aragona y de Cardona, 4th Duke of Montalto, (*1543 - +Naples, Italy, 1583); 1st marriage: at Naples, Italy, after 7 February 1562, Maria de la Cerda y Manuel, born 1542; 2nd marriage: Aloisia de Luna, Duchess of Bivona, deceased 1619; kids by 2nd marriage:
 Maria d'Aragona y de Luna, 5th Duchesa of Montalto; she married,  1590, Sicilian Francesco de Moncada y de Luna, 3rd Prince di Paternò, deceased 1595. Issue: 
 The so-called Antonio de Aragón y Moncada, 6th Duke of Montalto (1589–1631), 4th Prince di Paternò, 5th Duke of Bivona, who married Juana de la Cerda y la Cueva, daughter of Juan Luis Francisco de la Cerda y Aragón, 6th Duke of Medinaceli. Notice he used first his mother family name and after his father family name, used sometimes in Spain with much influential and richer females at those times.
 Bianca Antonia d'Aragona y de Luna 
 Ana Maria d'Aragona y de Luna;(+1677).  She married Spanish-Portuguese General Francisco de Moura, 3rd Marquis of Castel Rodrigo, (1610 - 26 November 1675), Duke of Nocera on 10 August 1656, Viceroy of Sardinia, 1657–1661, and Governor of the Habsburg Netherlands,  1664-1668.
 Isabella d'Aragona y de Cardona, +31 August 1578; she married, 24 May 1565 Juan de la Cerda, 5th Duke of Medinaceli,  (1544 - 5th Duke since 1575 - 29 May 1594).
 Giovanna d'Aragona y Cardona?, (*1502 - divorced 1550 - +11 September 1575). She married Ascanio I Colonna, Duke dei Marsi, (1500 - 24 March 1557), brother of famous art and literary woman Vittoria Colonna, (Marino, Italy, April 1490 – Roma, Italy, February 1547) .
 Maria d'Aragona, (*1505, +1568); married Alfonso d'Avalos d'Aquino, Marquess del Vasto e Pescara, (25 May 1502 - + Vigevano, Italy,  31 March 1546).

Full siblings of Fernando de Aragón y Guardato, 1st Duke of Montalto
 Maria d'Aragona y Guardato, (*1440 - +1460/61); married, 1458 Antonio Todeschini-Piccolomini, Duke of Amalfi, deceased 1493, nephew of Pope Pius II, a.k.a. Enea Silvio Piccolomini,(Corsignano, 1405 - Pope 1458 - Ancona, Italy, 1464).
 Giovanna d'Aragona y Guardato, (*Naples, 1455 - +Rome, 1501) ; she married in 1472 Lionardo della Rovere, Duke of Sora (*1445  - +1475)

Gallery

References
 
Detlev Schwennicke : Europäische Stammtafeln Band III.3 (1985) Tafel 550. In German.
http://grandesp.org.uk/historia/gzas/bivona.htm . In Spanish.
http://grandesp.org.uk/historia/gzas/medinasidonia.htm  . In Spanish.
www.abcgenealogia.com/delaCerda00.html . In Spanish.
http://geneall.net/H/fam_names.php?id=626 In Spanish.
http://www.grandesp.org.uk/historia/gzas/aitona.htm In Spanish.
es.fundacionmedinaceli.org/.../agregacion_titulos.aspx In Spanish.
https://web.archive.org/web/20110716064129/http://www.tercios.org/camp1635_1.html In Spanish.

1542 deaths
Dukes of Spain
Year of birth uncertain
Illegitimate children of Neapolitan monarchs
Sons of kings